The Qarmatians were a militant Isma'ili Shia movement centred in al-Hasa in Eastern Arabia, where they established a religious-utopian socialist state in 899 CE. Its members were part of a movement that adhered to a syncretic branch of Sevener Ismaili Shia Islam, and were ruled by a dynasty founded by Abu Sa'id al-Jannabi, a Persian from Jannaba in coastal Fars. They rejected the claim of Fatimid caliph Abdallah al-Mahdi Billah to imamate and clung to their belief in the coming of the Mahdi, and they revolted against the Fatimid and Abbasid Caliphates.

Mecca was sacked by a Qarmatian leader, Abu Tahir al-Jannabi, outraging the Muslim world, particularly with their theft of the Black Stone and desecration of the Zamzam Well with corpses during the Hajj season of 930 CE.

Name
The origin of the name "Qarmatian" is uncertain. According to some sources, the name derives from the surname of the sect's founder, Hamdan Qarmat.  The name qarmat probably comes from the Aramaic for "short-legged", "red-eyed" or "secret teacher". Other sources, however, say that the name comes from the Arabic verb  (qarmaṭ), which means "to make the lines close together in writing" or "to walk with short steps".  The word "Qarmatian" can also refer to a type of Arabic script.

The Qarāmiṭah in southern Iraq were also known as "the Greengrocers" (al-Baqliyyah) because they followed the teachings of Abū Hātim al-Zutti, who, in 908, forbid animal slaughter. He also forbid radishes and alliums such as garlic, onions, and leeks. By 928, it is uncertain whether people still held on to these teachings.

History

Early developments 
Under the Abbasid Caliphate (750–1258 CE), various Shiite groups organised in secret opposition to their rule. Among them were the supporters of the proto-Ismā‘īlī community, of whom the most prominent group were called the Mubārakiyyah.

According to the Ismaili school of thought, Imām Ja'far al-Sadiq (702–765) designated his second son, Isma'il ibn Ja'far (ca. 721–755), as heir to the Imamate. However, Ismā‘īl predeceased his father. Some claimed he had gone into hiding, but the proto-Ismā‘īlī group accepted his death and therefore accordingly recognized Ismā‘īl's eldest son, Muhammad ibn Isma'il (746–809), as Imām. He remained in contact with the Mubārakiyyah group, most of whom resided in Kufa.

The split among the Mubārakiyyah came with the death of Muḥammad ibn Ismā‘īl (ca. 813 CE). The majority of the group denied his death; they recognized him as the Mahdi. The minority believed in his death and would eventually emerge in later times as the Isma'ili Fatimid Caliphate, the precursors to all modern groups.

The majority Ismā‘īlī missionary movement settled in Salamiyah (in present-day Syria) and had great success in Khuzestan (southwestern Iran), where the Ismā‘īlī leader al-Husayn al-Ahwāzī converted the Kūfan man Ḥamdān in 874 CE, who took the name Qarmaṭ after his new faith. Qarmaṭ and his theologian brother-in-law ‘Abdān prepared southern Iraq for the coming of the Mahdi by creating a military and religious stronghold. Other such locations grew up in Yemen, in Eastern Arabia (Arabic Bahrayn) in 899, and in North Africa. These attracted many new Shi'i followers due to their activist and messianic teachings. This new proto-Qarmaṭī movement continued to spread into Greater Iran and then into Transoxiana.

The Qarmatian Revolution

A change in leadership in Salamiyah in 899 led to a split in the movement. The minority Ismā‘īlīs, whose leader had taken control of the Salamiyah centre, began to proclaim their teachings – that Imām Muḥammad had died, and that the new leader in Salamiyah (Abdallah al-Mahdi Billah) was in fact his descendant come out of hiding and was the Mahdi (a Messianic figure who will appear on Earth before the Day of Judgment and rid the world of wrongdoing, injustice and tyranny). Qarmaṭ and his brother-in-law opposed this and openly broke with the Salamiyids; when ‘Abdān was assassinated, he went into hiding and subsequently repented. Qarmaṭ became a missionary of the new Imām, Abdallah al-Mahdi Billah (873–934), who founded the Fatimid Caliphate in North Africa in 909.

Nonetheless, the dissident group retained the name Qarmaṭī. Their greatest stronghold remained in Bahrain, which at this period included much of eastern Arabia as well as the islands that comprise the present state. It was under Abbasid control at the end of the ninth century, but the Zanj Rebellion in Basra disrupted the power of Baghdad. The Qarmaṭians seized their opportunity under their leader, Abu Sa'id al-Jannabi, a Persian who hailed from Jannaba in coastal Fars. Eventually, from Qatar, he captured Bahrain's capital Hajr and al-Hasa in 899, which he made the capital of his state and once in control of the state he sought to set up a utopian society.

The Qarmaṭians instigated what one scholar termed a "century of terror" in Kufa. They considered the pilgrimage to Mecca a superstition and once in control of the Bahrayni state, they launched raids along the pilgrim routes crossing the Arabian Peninsula: in 906 they ambushed the pilgrim caravan returning from Mecca and massacred 20,000 pilgrims.

Under al-Jannabi (ruled 923–944), the Qarmaṭians came close to capturing Baghdad in 927, and sacked Mecca and Medina in 930. In their attack on Islam's holiest sites, the Qarmatians desecrated the Zamzam Well with corpses of Hajj pilgrims and took the Black Stone from Mecca to Ain Al Kuayba in Qatif. Holding the Black Stone to ransom, they forced the Abbasids to pay a huge sum for its return in 952.

The revolution and desecration shocked the Muslim world and humiliated the Abbasids. But little could be done; for much of the tenth century the Qarmatians were the most powerful force in the Persian Gulf and Middle East, controlling the coast of Oman and collecting tribute from the caliph in Baghdad as well as from a rival Isma'ili imam in Cairo, the head of the Fatimid Caliphate, whose power they did not recognize.

Qarmatian society
The land they ruled over was extremely wealthy with a huge slave-based economy according to academic Yitzhak Nakash:

Collapse
According to Farhad Daftary, the catalyst of the collapse of Qarmatian movement as a whole happened in the year 931 CE when Abu Tahir al-Janabi – the Qarmatian leader in Bahrain – handed over the reins of the state in Bahrain to  Abu'l-Fadl al-Isfahani, a young Persian  man who had been believed by the Qarmatians to be the Mahdi. However, Abu Tahir soon realized al-Isfahani's appointment was a disastrous mistake, after the "Mahdi" executed some nobles and insulted Muhammad and the other prophets. The incident shocked the Qarmatians and the Islamic community as a whole, and Abu Tahir ordered the youth's execution.

Leadership under al-Isfahani lasted only 80 days before his execution, but it greatly weakened the credibility of Qarmatians within the Muslim community in general, and heralded the beginning of the end of their revolutionary movements.

After defeat by the Abbasids in 976, the Qarmatians began to look inwards and their status was reduced to that of a local power. This had severe consequences for the Qarmatians' ability to extract tribute from the region; according to Arabist historian Curtis Larsen:

In Bahrain and eastern Arabia the Qarmatian state was replaced by the Uyunid dynasty, while it is believed that by the middle of the eleventh century Qarmatian communities in Iraq, Iran, and Transoxiana had either been integrated by Fatimid proselytism, or had disintegrated.

By the mid 10th century, persecution forced the Qarmatians to leave Egypt and Iraq, and move towards city of Multan in Pakistan. However, the prejudice against the Qarmatians did not dwindle, as Mahmud of Ghazni led an expedition against Multan's Qarmatian ruler Abdul Fateh Daud in 1005. The city was surrendered, and Fateh Daud was permitted to retain control over the city with the condition that he adhere to Sunnism.

According to maritime historian Dionisius A. Agius, the Qarmatians finally disappeared in 1067 after they lost their fleet at Bahrain Island, and were expelled from Hasa near the Arabian coast by the chief of Banu, Murra ibn Amir.

Imamate of Seven Imams 
According to Qarmatians, the number of imams was fixed, with Seven Imāms preordained by God. These groups considers Muhammad ibn Isma'il to be the messenger – prophet (Rasūl), Imām al-Qā'im and Mahdi to be preserved in hiding, which is referred to as Occultation.

Ismaili imams who were not accepted as legitimate by Qarmatians

In addition, the following Ismaili imams after Muhammad ibn Isma'il had been considered heretics of dubious origins by certain Qarmatian groups, who refused to acknowledge the imamate of the Fatimids and clung to their belief in the coming of the Mahdi.
 Isma'il ibn Ja'far (765–775)
 Abadullah ibn Muhammad (Ahmad al-Wafi) (813–829)
 Ahmad ibn Abadullah (Muhammad at-Taqi) (829–840)
 Husayn ibn Ahmad (Radi Abdullah) (840–881)
 Abdallah al-Mahdi Billah (881–934) (Founder of Fatimid Caliphate)

Qarmatian rulers in Eastern Arabia

 Abu Sa'id al-Jannabi (894–914)
 Abu Tahir al-Jannabi (914–944)
 Ahmad Abu Tahir (944–970) 
 Abul Kassim Sa'id (970–972)
 Abu Yaqub Yousuf (972–977)
Descendants of Abu Yaqub Yousuf ruled until 1077

Substitution after Abu Tahir al-Jannabi 
Farhad Daftary writes about the fate of the successors of Abu Tahir al-Jannabi:

See also
 al-Hasa
 Khurramites
 Mazdakism

References

Sources
 
 
 
 
 
 
 
 Kathryn Babayan 2002: Mystics, Monarchs, and Messiahs: Cultural Landscapes of Early Modern Iran,

External links
 Ismaili Net, The origin of the Qarmatians
 Ismaili Net, Qarmatians in Bahrain
 Encyclopædia Iranica, CARMATIANS
 Encyclopædia Iranica, ḤAMDĀN QARMAṬ
 Women and the Fatimids in the world of Islam
 Encyclopaedia of the Orient
 Maymūn’āl-Qaddāh
 Encyclopædia Iranica, "ʿAbdallāh B. Maymūn Al-Qaddāḥ"

 
Bahraini monarchs
Iranian dynasties
Iranian Muslim dynasties
Ismaili dynasties
Shia dynasties